Sir Arthur Cuninghame Grant Duff,  (23 May 1861 – 11 April 1948) was a British diplomat who was Minister to several countries.

Career
Arthur Cuninghame Grant Duff was the eldest son of M.E. Grant Duff (later Sir Mountstuart Grant Duff). He was educated at Clifton College and Balliol College, Oxford. He entered HM Diplomatic Service in 1865 and was posted as attaché to the embassy in Madrid. After serving in Vienna, Stockholm and Peking he was recalled to London in 1897 and spent three years working at the Foreign Office. He then began a succession of short appointments in Caracas, as Second Secretary at Berne, Secretary of Legation in Mexico from September 1902, Caracas again, Mexico again, Stockholm again, and Brussels. In some of those postings he was Chargé d'affaires in the absence of the minister or ambassador. In 1906 he was appointed chargé d'affaires at Darmstadt and Karlsruhe (then the capitals of the Grand Duchies of Hesse and Baden respectively), but after only six months he was sent to Havana as Minister to Cuba. In the summer of 1909 he returned to Europe and the courts of minor German states, combining the roles of Minister Resident at Dresden (Kingdom of Saxony) and at Coburg (Saxe-Coburg-Gotha) and Chargé d'Affaires at Waldeck-Pyrmont. He remained there until the outbreak of the First World War in 1914 when he returned to London to work in Admiralty Intelligence until 1919.

After the war, Grant Duff was Minister to Peru and Ecuador 1920–23, to Chile 1923–24, and to Sweden 1924–27. He retired in 1927 after 42 years' service.

Arthur Grant Duff was knighted KCMG in the King's Birthday Honours of 1924 at the end of his service in Chile. The Swedish government awarded him the Grand Cross of the Order of the Star of the North.

Family
In 1906 Arthur Grant Duff married Kathleen, younger daughter of General Powell Clayton, who had been U.S. Ambassador to Mexico when Grant Duff was posted there. She died in 1963.

References
GRANT-DUFF, Sir Arthur Cuninghame, Who Was Who, A & C Black, 1920–2008; online edn, Oxford University Press, Dec 2007, retrieved 22 June 2012] 17 June 2012
Obituary: Sir Arthur Grant Duff, The Times, London, 14 April 1948, page 7

Offices held

1861 births
1948 deaths
People educated at Clifton College
Alumni of Balliol College, Oxford
Ambassadors of the United Kingdom to Cuba
Ambassadors of the United Kingdom to Peru
Ambassadors of the United Kingdom to Ecuador
Ambassadors of the United Kingdom to Chile
Ambassadors of the United Kingdom to Sweden
Knights Grand Cross of the Order of St Michael and St George
Commanders Grand Cross of the Order of the Polar Star